McGilberry is a surname. Notable people with the surname include:

Harry McGilberry (1950–2006), American rhythm and blues singer
Randy McGilberry (born 1953), American baseball player